Anusha Mani (born 29 March 1985) is an Indian female playback singer who works actively in the Bollywood film industry.

Early and personal life
Anusha hails from a musically-inclined family, and learnt Carnatic music from Smt Meera Nathan. Having sung in Gujarati plays, she met Amit Trivedi with whom she made a music album, which was never released.

She is married to singer-composer Sangeet Haldipur of Sangeet-Siddharth, the son of Amar Haldipur and brother of Siddharth Haldipur.

Career
Her big break came in 2007, when Shankar Mahadevan of Shankar–Ehsaan–Loy offered her the chance to sing the track Dhoka from Johnny Gaddaar after listening to an album she'd appeared on. She has since then worked in about six albums with the trio to date. She had also sung and written the track Dil Mein Jaagi from the Dev.D, which won Amit Trivedi the National Film Award for Best Music Direction. She also does concerts for musicians. Her Lehrein song which was written by Javaid Akhtar was included in Aisha Movie. The Fearless & fabulous Anusha was a part of the TV show MTV Angles of Rock where she along with Shalmali Kholgade, Jasmine Sandlas & Akasa Singh set out on an epic road trip & inspired women from all across the nation, performing some of their amazing original composition 5 In 2021. Mani featured in a unique film focussed on the plight of stray animals.

Filmography
 Johnny Gaddaar (2007)
 Thoda Pyaar Thoda Magic (2008)
 Dev.D (2009)
 Sikandar (2009)
 Hum Tum Aur Ghost (2010)
 Tere Bin Laden (2010)
 Aisha (2010)
 Game (2011)
 Don 2: The King is Back (2011)
 Chennai Express (2013)
 Shaandaar (2015)
 Ruler (2019)
 The Tails of Boo Boo and Cuddly Poo (2021)

References

External links
 
 Anusha Mani : Filmography and Profile  on Bollywood Hungama

Living people
Bollywood playback singers
Indian women playback singers
1985 births
21st-century Indian singers
21st-century Indian women singers